Guillaume de Vottem (died 1403), was prior of the Benedictine Abbey of St James the Less, in Liège. A chronicle of Liège from 1402, which survives in a 16th-century manuscript now in the Royal Library of Belgium, has been ascribed to his authorship.

References

1403 deaths
Belgian Benedictines
15th-century historians from the Holy Roman Empire